Eden is a small unincorporated community in Graham County, Arizona, United States. It is part of the Safford Micropolitan Statistical Area. Eden has a ZIP Code of 85535; in 2000, the population of the 85535 ZCTA was 150.

The first settlement at Eden was made in 1881. The community was named after the Garden of Eden in the Hebrew Bible.

Geography

Features

The area hosted the Indian Hot Springs Hotel until February 2008, when it burned down. The mansion was rumored to host the likes of the Rolling Stones on more than one occasion. The mansion had a 70' × 270' pool, the largest ever in Graham County.

In film
Director Jaymes Thompson filmed The Gay Bed and Breakfast of Terror at the Eden mansion.

See also
 Indian Hot Springs

References

External links
 Eden – ghosttowns.com

Unincorporated communities in Graham County, Arizona
Safford, Arizona micropolitan area
Unincorporated communities in Arizona